The Queen's Award for Enterprise Promotion is one of the Queen's Awards for Enterprise, and is awarded annually to people who play an outstanding role in promoting the growth of business enterprise and/or entrepreneurial skills in other people.  It is bestowed by the Queen on the advice of the Prime Minister of the United Kingdom.  Recipients receive an engraved crystal glass commemorative item, a Grant of Appointment and are invited to a reception at Buckingham Palace.
For example, people who:
 give up their time – and sometimes provide financial support – to help potential entrepreneurs in education or in the early phases of business development
 work in education, training or youth work and help provide others with enterprise skills
 are involved in social enterprise and either achieve business outcomes or help others develop business skills
Entry is by nomination only and individuals cannot put themselves forward.

Thirteen awardees have been from the National Enterprise Network.

History
The award was initiated in 2004, with the first awards being made in 2005. The award is for achievement in enterprise promotion, between five and ten awards have been made annually since 2005, in addition to one lifetime achievement award each year and sometimes an honorary award (three such awards have been made as of 2015).

2016

Lifetime Achievement
 Dorothy Francis, MBE, Co-Director of Co-operative and Social Enterprise Development Agency (CASE), Leicester

Achievement in Enterprise Promotion
 Darrin M Disley Co-Founder and Chief Executive Officer of Horizon Discovery Group plc, Cambridge
 Bejay Mulenga, Founder, Supa Tuck and Supa Academy, London
 Katherine Welch, Founder, Social Enterprise Acumen CIC, Durham
 Claire Locke, DL, Founder, Artigiano, Entrepreneur and Angel Investor, Vice-Chair of The Prince's Trust Enterprise Fellowship, Trustee, 1851 Trust, Portsmouth

2015

Lifetime Achievement
Christopher Pichon The Wenta Business Centre

Achievement in Enterprise Promotion
 Steven Stokes of the University of Wales Trinity St Davids
 Margaret Gibson of Women's Enterprise Scotland
 Richard Holt of Creative Innovation Centre CIC
 Nelson Campbell Gray, business investor
 Lopa Patel digital media entrepreneur

2014

Lifetime Achievement
 Wray Irwin Director of Employability and Engagement, University of Northampton

Achievement in Enterprise Promotion
 Christine Atkinson, Deputy Director of Entrepreneurship, University of South Wales, Pontypridd, Wales
 Timothy Barnes, Director of Enterprise Operations and UCL Advances, University College London; Founder of Citrus Saturday, London
 Eric Binns, Enterprise Officer, Calderdale Council, Halifax, West Yorkshire
 Mark Hart, Chair, Small Business and Entrepreneurship, Aston University, Birmingham
 Guy Mucklow, Chief Executive Officer, Postcode Anywhere (Europe) Ltd, Worcester
 Ann Stonehouse, Chair, Assist Women's Network, Middlesbrough, North Yorkshire
 Jayne Taggert, Chief Executive, Causeway Enterprise Agency, Coleraine, County Londonderry, Northern Ireland

2013

Lifetime Achievement
 Claire Dove MBE, Chief Executive, Blackburne House Group, Liverpool, Merseyside

Achievement in Enterprise Promotion
 Lady Cunningham, Enterprise Development Coach, Ways into Successful Enterprise, Allerdale Borough Council, Workington, Cumbria
 Rajeeb Dey, CEO and Founder, Enternships, London EC1
 Richard Gallafent, patent and trade mark attorney, senior partner in Gallafents LLP, a private practice in London
 Michael Herd, Executive Director, The Sussex Innovation Centre, University of Sussex, Falmer, East Sussex
 Ian Smith, Vice Principal, Surbiton High School for Girls, Kingston upon Thames, Surrey
 Elizabeth Towns-Andrews, Director of Research and Enterprise, University of Huddersfield, Huddersfield, West Yorkshire
 John Vernon, Business Advisor, Oxfordshire Business Enterprise, Banbury, Oxfordshire

2012

Lifetime Achievement
 Carmel Gahan Director of Ross Carberry Ltd, Swansea, Wales

Achievement in Enterprise Promotion
 Steve Rawlings, chief executive of Lakehouse, Romford, Essex
 Brian Tanner, professor of physics and Dean of Knowledge Transfer, Durham University, Durham
 Sandy Ogilvie, retired chief executive, Project North East, Gateshead, Tyne and Weir
 Claire Ferris, Manager, Work West Enterprise Agency, Belfast, N. Ireland
 Steve Hoyle, managing director, Regenerate Pennine Lancashire Ltd, Accrington, Lancashire
 Elizabeth Tappenden, Director, In To Biz Limited, The Isle of Wight
 Hugh Burnett OBE, DL, founder and chairman, Enterprise Works, Newhaven, East Sussex
 Russell Smith, chief executive officer, Business Boffins Ltd, Chinnor, Oxfordshire
 Chris Hunt, retired assistant head teacher and director, Stress in Teaching Limited, Bournemouth, Dorset
 Stuart Langworthy, Director of Business and Enterprise Specialism, Millbrook Academy, Brockworth, Gloucester

2011

Lifetime Achievement
 Ronald Batty former chief executive, CDC Enterprise Agency, Durham, County Durham

Achievement in Enterprise Promotion
 Keith Bates, development consultant of Keith Bates Development Services, Bristol
 David Benstead director of Diodes Zetex Limited, Oldham, Greater Manchester
 Robert Blackburn director of the Small Business Research Centre, Kingston University, Kingston upon Thames, London
 Alison Brown, head of technology, director of specialism, Catcote School Business and Enterprise College, Hartlepool, County Durham
 Geoffrey Davies OBE, managing director Alamo Group Europe Ltd., vice president, Alamo Inc (US), Worcestershire
 Paul Davies, voluntary chief executive and business coach, Clowne Enterprise, Clowne, Derbyshire
 Victoria Lennox, founder and chair of trustees, National Consortium of University Entrepreneurs, London
 Susan Marlow, professor of entrepreneurship, De Montfort University, Leicester
 Alexander Pratt founder of Serious Brands Ltd., Bierton, Buckinghamshire
 Khalid Saifullah director of Star Tissue UK Ltd., Blackburn, Lancashire

2010
In 2009 there were postal delays due to a strike, and the nomination period for 2010 was extended to 4 November 2009.

Lifetime Achievement

 (George) Douglas Scott, chief executive officer, TEDCO Ltd, Jarrow, Tyne and Wear.

Achievement in Enterprise Promotion
 Timothy Allan, former chair, Young Enterprise Scotland, Glasgow, Scotland.
 Nicholas Bowen, head teacher, St Benet Biscop Catholic High School, Bedlington, Northumberland.
 Paul Davidson, chief executive, Bolton Business Ventures, Bolton, Lancashire.
 Simon Denny, associate dean, Research and Knowledge Transfer, Northampton Business School, University of Northampton, Northamptonshire.
 Beverly Hurley, chief executive, YTKO, Cambridge.
 Murdoch MacLeod, director, MacLeod Construction Limited, Lochgilphead, Argyll, Scotland.
 Maureen Milgram Forrest, founder chair and current chair, LeicesterHerDay Trust, Leicester.
 Kenneth Nelson, chief executive officer and company secretary, Larne Enterprise Development Company Ltd (LEDCOM), Larne, Northern Ireland.
 Frank Nicholson, former managing director, Vaux Breweries, Sunderland, Tyne and Wear.
 Ederyn Williams, director, Warwick Ventures, University of Warwick, Coventry, Warwickshire.

2009

Lifetime Achievement
 (Arthur) Allan Gibb OBE, Former Director, Small Business Centre, Durham University, Durham

Achievement in Enterprise Promotion
 Karen Arnold, Chief Executive, The Enterprise and Skills Company Limited, Wimborne, Dorset.
 Charles John Cracknell, Youth Enterprise and Microbusiness Manager, Hull City Council, East Riding of Yorkshire.
 Jacqueline Frost, Enterprise Projects Manager, Rotherham Metropolitan Borough Council, South Yorkshire.
 David Irwin, Partner, Irwin Grayson associates, Stocksfield, Northumberland.
 James Murray Wells, Founder and Executive Chairman of Prescription Eyewear Limited (trading as Glasses Direct), London.
 Beverley Pold, Business Development and Policy Manager, Chwarae Teg/Fair Play, Cardiff.
 John Thompson, Roger M Bale Professor of Entrepreneurship, University of Huddersfield, West Yorkshire.
 Angela Wright, Chief Executive, Solent Skill Quest Limited, Southampton, Hampshire.
 Charlotte Young, Chair of Board of Trustees, School for Social Entrepreneurs, London.

Honorary
 Charles Gerard Ford, Director and Chief Executive of Advantage Northern Ireland Limited, Newtownabbey, Northern Ireland.

2008

Lifetime Achievement
 John Eversley MBE, director and vice-chair, Tyne and Wear Enterprise Trust Ltd, Newcastle upon Tyne.

Achievement in Enterprise Promotion
 Zulfiqar Ali, chairman, Reach BCS, Rochdale, Lancashire.
 Sally Arkley, managing director, Womens Business Development Agency, Coventry, Warwickshire.
 Paul Barry-Walsh, chairman, Fredericks Foundation, Lightwater, Surrey and chairman, Netstore plc, Reading, Berkshire.
 Brian Dunsby, principal, Perlex associates, Harrogate, North Yorkshire.
 John Jennens, business counsellor, Oxfordshire Business Enterprise, Banbury, Oxfordshire.
 Michael Leithrow, executive director and general manager, Northern Pinetree Trust, Birtley, County Durham.
 John May, chief executive, Career Academies UK, London.
 Pamela Neal, mentor and workshop facilitator, CODA Business Management Ltd, Newport, Wales.
 Janette Pallas, business incubation and enterprise manager, De Montfort University, Leicester.

Honorary
 Nicholas O'Shiel, director and chief executive, Omagh Enterprise Company Ltd, Omagh, County Tyrone, Northern Ireland.

2007

Lifetime Achievement

 Joan Richards MBE, youth business advisor, Business Connect, Neath, Port Talbot, Wales

Achievement in Enterprise Promotion
 Pauline Barnett, deputy chief executive, East London Small Business Centre Ltd., London.
 Nigel Brown, chairman, NW Brown Group Limited, Cambridge.
 Jane Delfino, innovations director, United Learning Trust, Manchester.
 Anne Duncan, chief executive, Yellowfin Ltd., Southampton.
 Geoffrey Ford, chairman, Ford Component Manufacturing Limited, South Shields, Tyne and Wear.
 Charles Hadcock, owner and director, The Watermark, Preston, Lancashire.
 Janet Scicluna, proprietor, Janet Scicluna associates, Cardiff.
 David Secher, chief executive, N8 Group, Sheffield.
 Caroline Theobald, managing director, Bridge Club Ltd., Newcastle upon Tyne.

2006

Lifetime Achievement

 David Rowe, director of the University of Warwick Science Park Ltd, West Midlands.

Achievement in Enterprise Promotion
 John Anderson CBE, non-executive chairman of the North-East Business and Innovation Centre, Sunderland
 Derek Browne, chief executive of Entrepreneurs in Action, London.
 Janet Brumby, development manager of Young Enterprise, Hull and East Riding.
 Walter Herriot OBE, managing director of St John's Innovation Centre, Cambridge
 Jason Holt, director, R Holt & Co, London.
 Bryan Keating, managing partner of the CIP partnership, visiting professor at the University of Ulster and chairman of the advisory board of the Northern Ireland Centre for Entrepreneurship, Belfast.
 David Kirby, professor of entrepreneurship, University of Surrey, Guildford.
 Amanda Parris, business centre manager, Rotherham Investment and Development Office, Rotherham Metropolitan Borough Council, South Yorkshire.
 Peter Westgarth, chief executive, The Duke of Edinburgh's Award Scheme and former chief executive of Young Enterprise UK, Oxford.

Honorary
 Douglas Richard, director and co-founder, Library House, Cambridge.

2005

Lifetime Achievement
 Kenneth O'Neill, Professor of Entrepreneurship and Small Business Development, School of Marketing, Entrepreneurship and Strategy, University of Ulster, Northern Ireland

Achievement in Enterprise Promotion
 Sikander Badat, head of policy, Ethnic Minority Business Development, Chamber Link, Bolton
 Alan Barrell, FRSA, chairman of several companies, Cambridge
 Dinah Bennett, FRSA, OBE, programme director, Policy and International Development Centre for Executive Education and Enterprise, Durham Business School, Durham
 Stephen Dumbell, chief executive officer, Knowsley Development Trust, Merseyside
 Diane Gowland, director, Centre for Innovation and Partnerships, Newham College, London
 Gary McEwan, managing director, The Maitland Partnership Ltd, Hillington, Renfrewshire
 Brian Murray, chief executive, Workspace, The Business Centre, Draperstown, Magherafelt, Northern Ireland
 Joy Nichols, chief executive, Nichols Agency Ltd, London
 Edward Prosser, inventor/innovator, Cardiff
 Charles Skene, OBE, founder and trustee, Skene Young Entrepreneurs Award, Aberdeen

References

Business education in the United Kingdom